Fumaria densiflora is a species of annual herb in the family Papaveraceae. They have a self-supporting growth form and simple, broad leaves. Individuals can grow to 46 cm tall.

Sources

References 

densiflora
Flora of Malta